Gustavo Borner is an Argentine producer, engineer and mixer. He has worked with several artists both from Argentina like Fito Páez, Andrés Calamaro and León Gieco as well as from other countries of Latin America like Juanes, Ricky Martin and Pepe Aguilar, among others, he has also worked in several film and videogame scores such as Birdman, Guardians of the Galaxy Vol. 2 and Deadpool 2. For his work, Borner has received six Grammy Awards, eleven Latin Grammy Awards and a Cinema Audio Society Award.

Career
After finishing high school in Buenos Aires, Argentina in 1985, Borner went to Boston, United States to attend Berklee College of Music, graduating with a double major in Music Production and Engineering and Film Scoring. In 1989, he moved to Los Angeles, United States, where he has resided ever since, he began working as engineer with Argentine producer Bebu Silvetti in different albums by mainly Latin pop artists such as Luis Miguel, Plácido Domingo and Daniela Romo, among others. 

During the 90s, he worked with several Argentine artists like Enanitos Verdes, Los Pericos, Los Auténticos Decadentes, La Renga and Los Calzones Rotos, allowing him to gain recognition within Latin America. In 1996, Borner opened Igloo Music Studios in Los Angeles, a set of studios destined to the recording and production of albums as well as film scores. Borner has worked in the score of several Walt Disney Company films, including Hercules (1997) and Tarzan (1999), working in the latter alongside Phil Collins for the recording of the songs in different languages.

Borner has participated in several albums from the MTV Unplugged series, including with artists like Juanes, Ricky Martin, Pepe Aguilar and Los Tigres del Norte. Additionally, he has collaborated in various live albums like Insoportablemente Vivo (2001) by La Renga, Hola/Chau (2000) by Los Fabulosos Cadillacs, En Vivo (2000) and En Vivo, Vol. 2 (2001) by Marco Antonio Solís and Hecho en México - En Vivo en el Palacio de los Deportes – 25 Aniversario (2012) by Los Autenticos Decadentes. For Juanes's MTV Unplugged (2012), Borner won Album of the Year as engineer, mixer and mastering engineer.

Aside from albums by singers, Borner has continued to work in several film scores like Rush Hour (1998) and its sequels, Watchmen (2009), Guardians of the Galaxy (2014) and Deadpool 2 (2018), amons others, as well as video game scores. For his work as scoring mixer in Alejandro Gonzalez Iñarritu's Birdman (2014), Borner won the Grammy Award for Best Score Soundtrack for Visual Media and the Cinema Audio Society Award for Outstanding Achievement in Sound Mixing for a Motion Picture – Live Action.

Discography

(A) Album, (S), Single

Awards and nominations

Cinema Audio Society Awards

Grammy Awards

Latin Grammy Awards

References

Argentine record producers
Living people
Year of birth missing (living people)